Caerphilly County Borough Council is the governing body for Caerphilly County Borough, one of the Principal Areas of Wales. The last full council elections took place 5 May 2022.

Political control
The first election to the new council was held in 1995, initially operating as a shadow authority before coming into its powers on 1 April 1996. Political control of the council since 1996 has been held by the following parties:

Leadership
The first leader of the council, Graham Court, was the last leader of the old Rhymney Valley District Council. The leaders of Caerphilly since 1996 have been:

Current composition 
As of 5 May 2022.

Party with majority control in bold

Elections

Party with the most elected councillors in bold. Coalition agreements in notes column

Premises
The council inherited two main offices from its predecessor authorities: Ystrad Fawr House at Ystrad Mynach from Rhymney Valley District Council, and Pontllanfraith House in Pontllanfraith from Islwyn Borough Council. Ystrad Fawr House was demolished in 2008 to make way for the Ysbyty Ystrad Fawr hospital. A new headquarters was built at Penallta House in the Tredomen area of Ystrad Mynach (in the community of Gelligaer), opening in April 2008. The other office at Pontllanfraith House subsequently closed in 2015 and has since been demolished.

Electoral divisions
The county borough is divided into 30 electoral wards returning 69 councillors. Many of these wards are coterminous with communities (parishes) of the same name.  The following table lists council wards, communities and community ward areas.

Former wards
Until 2022, the county borough was divided into 33 electoral wards returning 73 councillors. Communities with a community council are indicated with a '*':

Allegations of misconduct
In 2015 Anthony O'Sullivan, the chief executive and two other executives were charged with misconduct during public office. It was alleged that they specifically 'wilfully misconducted themselves in relation to securing Caerphilly County Borough Council’s approval of a remuneration package for the said council’s chief officers from which they stood to gain for themselves'.

Relating to this and other failings the Welsh Assembly commissioned a special report on the council in January 2014

References

External links
Caerphilly County Borough Council

Politics of Caerphilly County Borough
Caerphilly